The Defence Diving School is a diver training centre in Hampshire, run by the Royal Navy.

History

Background
There were four Navy diving schools, with two in Devon. The two diving courses were eleven weeks, then nine weeks. Around half of the commercial divers in the North Sea were former British military divers.

In the 1950s, much diving was done from HMS Reclaim. Lt George Wookey set the current world record for deep diving at 600 ft off Norway on 12 October 1956.

Construction
Construction began in September 1994. It would train around 2000 divers a year.

It opened in September 1995, being previously at HMS Vernon as the Naval Diving School which joined with the RE Diving Establishment.

It was officially opened in early 1996, with the Sir Charles Pasley pool, by the Second Sea Lord.

At first, training for the RE and the Navy was separate. Three years in the Navy was required to apply to be a diver, but this policy was dropped in the late 1990s.

Female divers
It had its first female mine clearance diver on 19 November 2010, 28 year old Lieutenant Catherine Ker. The Royal Navy had changed its admissions policy for women, after the INM had found that women were at no more risk from decompression sickness (the bends) than men.

Incidents
 27 year old Lt Paul McAulay, from Clackmannanshire, died on Thursday 28 November 2002, after he choked on his own vomit after diving less than two hours after eating, which is not Royal Navy practice. His family were awarded £750,000 in June 2005.
 28 year old Lt David Christie died on 14 March 2002

Function
It trains frogmen (almost all are male, due to the demanding physical proficiency required) for the Royal Navy, and a few for the RE.

Structure
It is situated close to the M27.

See also
 Navy Divers, 2009 documentary series
 Royal Navy ships diver
 Underwater Escape Training Unit and Air 424
 United States Navy Experimental Diving Unit

References

External links
 Royal Navy

1995 establishments in the United Kingdom
Armed forces diving
Royal Navy bases in Hampshire
Training establishments of the Royal Navy
Underwater diving in the United Kingdom
Underwater diving training organizations